The Small Town Girl is a 1917 American silent drama film directed by John G. Adolfi and starring June Caprice, Jane Lee and Bert Delaney.

Cast
 June Caprice as June 
 Jane Lee as Jane 
 Bert Delaney as Frank 
 Ethyle Cooke as Mame 
 Tom Brooke
 Lucia Moore
 Inez Ranous
 Harry Southard
 John Burkell

References

Bibliography
 Solomon, Aubrey. The Fox Film Corporation, 1915-1935: A History and Filmography. McFarland, 2011.

External links

1917 films
1917 drama films
Silent American drama films
Films directed by John G. Adolfi
American silent feature films
1910s English-language films
American black-and-white films
Fox Film films
1910s American films